The 2007 BFGoodrich Langstreckenmeisterschaft (BFGLM) season was the 30th season of the VLN.

Calendar

Race Results
Results indicate overall winners only.

References

External links 
 
 

2007 in German motorsport
Nürburgring Endurance Series seasons